Moone High Cross is a high cross and national monument reputedly dating from the eighth century located in Moone, County Kildare, Republic of Ireland. At 17.5 feet high (including the base) it is the second tallest high cross in Ireland, and also one of the best preserved of its kind.

History
Moone High Cross is located within the ruins of the early monastic site of Moone Abbey, believed to have been founded by St. Palladius in the 5th century and dedicated to St Colmcille in the 6th century. The abbey lies on the banks of the River Greese in the village of Moone, County Kildare. Fragments of other high crosses are also present within the grounds of the abbey.

The high cross lay undiscovered until 1835, when two sections of the high cross were unearthed whilst works were being carried out in the graveyard of the ruined abbey. The then-Duke of Leinster, Charles FitzGerald, arranged for the re-erection of the cross as the sections were so well-preserved. Sixty years later, in 1893, the middle section was found and added to the cross revealing its true height.

The high cross is featured on the 'Kildare Monastic Trail', a self-guided tour designed to facilitate discovery of County Kildare's round towers, high crosses and monasteries. A roof exists over the cross to protect it from erosion.

Description
The high cross is made of granite and was constructed in three sections; an upper, middle and base. The cross is heavily decorated and depicts scenes from both the Old Testament and New Testament of the Bible, including Daniel in the lions' den, the three children in the fiery furnace and the miracle of the loaves and fishes. The cross was intended as a didactic tool with which to teach the illiterate native population about Christianity. This is conclusive as the iconography of the cross pertains to that of the popular form of prayer at that time, with references to both the old and new testaments.

References

National Monuments in County Kildare
High crosses in the Republic of Ireland